Didamar Lighthouse (also known as Quoin Island Lighthouse) is the northernmost lighthouse in Oman, located on Little Quoin Island in the As Salamah Archipelago north of Musandam Peninsula in the Strait of Hormuz.

See also

List of lighthouses in Oman
Quoin Island (Persian Gulf)

References

External links
 maps.google.co.uk
 Picture of Didamar Lighthouse

Islands of Oman
Lighthouses in Oman